Terrence Louis Henderson Jr., better known by his stage name Punch, is an American rapper, songwriter, record producer and record executive from Carson, California. He is best known for being the president of independent record label Top Dawg Entertainment (TDE). He has also executive produced several successful albums, including Kendrick Lamar's Section.80 (2011), Schoolboy Q's Habits & Contradictions (2012), Terrace Martin's 3ChordFold, (2013) and more. Aside from his solo musical career, Punch is a member of hip hop collective A Room Full of Mirrors, alongside fellow rappers Daylyt, Nick Grant, The Ichiban Don, Lyric Michelle, Hari, and more.

Career 
Terrence Henderson founded the Carson, California-based independent record label Top Dawg Entertainment (TDE) in 2004, with Anthony "Top Dawg" Tiffith and Dave "Miyatola" Free. He then began his musical career in 2007 under the moniker Punch. In March 2016, Punch revealed plans to release his debut studio album. Punch told Billboard that he plans on doing "a project for sure", even though his artistic process has usually come in spurts: "I think I’m going to finally finish it because I write a lot and I record every so often. I think I’m just gonna go ahead and knock it out at this point." On December 5, 2016, Punch released a single titled "Gold".

Discography

Studio albums

Mixtapes

Singles

| - Pay No Attention To The Man Behind The Curtains

Guest appearances

References

External links 
 
 

African-American male rappers
Living people
People from Carson, California
Rappers from California
West Coast hip hop musicians
American music industry executives
African-American songwriters
Songwriters from California
Top Dawg Entertainment artists
Year of birth missing (living people)
21st-century American rappers
21st-century American male musicians
21st-century African-American musicians
American male songwriters